Rolando Rivas, taxista is a 1972-3 Argentine telenovela and a 1974 romantic drama film directed by Julio Saraceni and starring Claudio García Satur and Soledad Silveyra. It was created by Alberto Migré.

Film cast
Claudio García Satur as Rolando Rivas
Soledad Silveyra as Mónica Helguera Paz
Marcelo Marcote as Quique
Beba Bidart
Antonio Grimau 		
Pablo Codevila as Juanjo
Adriana Aguirre 		
Mabel Landó as Teresa
Héctor Biuchet 		
Laura Bove 		
Héctor Gance

References

External links
 

1974 films
1970s Spanish-language films
Films directed by Julio Saraceni
1974 romantic drama films
Argentine telenovelas
Argentine romantic drama films
1970s Argentine films